Golf at the 2013 Canada Summer Games was held at the Misby Golf Club in Sherbrooke, Quebec. It was run from 14 to 17 August. There were four events of golf, male and female individual and team.

Medal table
The following is the medal table for golf at the 2013 Canada Summer Games.

Results

References

2013 Canada Summer Games
Canada Summer Games
Canada Summer Games
2013 Canada Summer Games